Szabo Bluff is a bluff standing just north of Price Bluff on the divide between Van Reeth and Robison Glaciers, in the Queen Maud Mountains. Mapped by United States Geological Survey (USGS) from surveys and U.S. Navy air photos, 1960–64. Named by Advisory Committee on Antarctic Names (US-ACAN) for Lieutenant Alex J. Szabo, aircraft pilot of U.S. Navy Squadron VX-6 during Operation Deep Freeze 1966 and 1967.

References 

Cliffs of Marie Byrd Land
Queen Maud Mountains